The National Fossil Wood Park, Tiruvakkarai is a notified National Geo-heritage Monument located in the Villupuram District in the Indian state of Tamil Nadu and is maintained by the Geological Survey of India. The park was established in 1940 and is located 1 km east of Thiruvakkarai village on the road between Tindivanam and Pondicherry.

Wood fossils

The park consists of nine enclaves, but only a small portion of the 247 acres (approx 1 square km) is open to the public. Officials of the GSI believe the fossils were formed during massive flooding that occurred millions of years ago.

The park hosts about 200 fossilized trees. They range in size from  meters in length, some of which are up to 5 meters in width. They are strewn and partially buried in the park grounds. No branches or leaves remain on the fossilised trunks. 

Scientists speculate that the trees did not originally grow at the site, but were transported before they had petrified. M. Sonneret, a European naturalist, gave the first detailed account of the fossils in 1781.

Quality of the fossils
The fossils are well preserved due to extensive petrifaction. The trees' annular rings and pit structures are clearly visible, allowing their age to be determined by counting the rings.

Gallery

See also
Mandla Plant Fossils National Park
Shivalik Fossil Park
Ghughua Fossil Park

References

External links

 Official Government Website

National Geological Monuments in India
Protected areas of Tamil Nadu
Petrified forests
Cenozoic paleontological sites of Asia
Fossil parks in India
Paleontology in India
1940 establishments in British India
Protected areas established in 1940